Journeys with the Black Dog: Inspirational Stories of Bringing Depression to Heel is a 2007 anthology edited by Tessa Wigney, Kerrie Eyers and Gordon Parker from the Black Dog Institute at the University of NSW. The book is a series of excerpts from submissions to a recent essay competition that examined how people live with major depression. The book contains a wide range of contributions from sufferers of depression.

Footnotes

2007 non-fiction books
2007 anthologies
Essay anthologies
Self-help books
Popular psychology
Books about depression